This article lists past, present and future television programming on American basic cable channel and former premium channel, Disney Channel, since its launch on April 18, 1983.

Current programming

Original

Live-action

Animated

Shorts

Animated

Repeats
A list of programs currently broadcast in reruns.

Live-action

Shorts

Disney Junior

A list of programs currently broadcast on the Disney Junior programming block of Disney Channel.

Upcoming programming

Original

Live-action

Animated

Acquired

Live-action

Animated

Disney Junior

Former programming

Original

Animated 

1 Indicates program premiered episodes on Disney XD.
2 Indicates program only airs reruns on the Disney XD cable channel.
3 Indicates program is a Disney Junior original series.

Comedy

Drama

Reality

Games

Variety

Miniseries and specials

Shorts

Syndicated (Originals/Walt Disney Television/ABC)

Acquired

Animated

Comedy

Drama

Reality

Variety

Disney Junior

Programming blocks

Current
Mickey Mornings (formerly Playhouse Disney and Disney Junior; April 6, 1997 – present) (rebranded on February 14, 2011, and launched as a channel on March 23, 2012, rebranded as Mickey Mornings in 2020)
Commercial Free Weekend Mornings (June 22, 2019 – present)

Former

Movies

See also

List of Disney Channel original films
ABC Kids
DisneyNow
List of Canadian programs broadcast by Disney Channel
List of programs broadcast by Disney Junior
List of programs broadcast by Disney XD

Notes

References

 
Disney Channel original programming
Disney Channel
Disney Channel related-lists